Jordan Coulter (born 17 December 1992) is an Australian male model from Gold Coast, Queensland.

Career
Coulter was discovered when he was 15 years old by model scout Kirk Blake from What Models after leaving a Gold Coast cinema.

He has also been featured in Vogue Hommes International, GQ Australia, Dolce & Gabbana, Numero Homme, Vogue Homme Japan and American Eagle.

Personal
His hobbies include surfing, snowboarding and rugby union.

References

External links
 Profile Jordan Coulter's profile on Scene Models
 VNY Model Management

1992 births
Living people
Australian male models
People from Rockhampton
People from the Gold Coast, Queensland